Meliosma vernicosa is a tropical tree in the family Sabiaceae.  It is a canopy tree of the cloud forest that reaches 20 to 25 meters tall. It prefers elevations of 1500 to 1700 meters.  It is found in Costa Rica.

References

vernicosa
Trees of Costa Rica